Tourougoumbé (also Trougoumbé) is a town and urban commune in the Cercle of Nioro in the Kayes Region of western Mali. The town lies 45 km east of Nioro du Sahel.

References

External links
.

Communes of Kayes Region